Mount Wells is a small regional park located northwest of the City of Langford and in the nearby vicinity of Goldstream Provincial Park and the Sooke Hills Regional Park Reserve. 

The parking lot is located at Humpback Lake, a former reservoir. The terminus of the decommissioned Sooke Flowline is also located here where the water from Sooke Lake would empty.

Hiking 

The park features one trail which leads to the  summit. The  trail takes about 45 minutes to reach the summit which provides a panoramic view of the region. Across the valley stands Mount McDonald in the Sooke Hills Regional Park Reserve which is closed to all public access.

Rock Climbing 

The side of the mountain facing the Humpback Valley is a popular climbing destination due to its steep cliffs. On a hot summer day, numerous vehicles can be seen parked along Humpback Road where climbers follow various deer trails to the cliffs.

References

External links 
 CRD Parks Page for Mount Wells

Parks in British Columbia